The Kirk's Cabin Complex was built by homesteader Rensselaer Lee Kirk circa 1890 in what would become Canyonlands National Park in Utah. Kirk was a small rancher who built a log cabin and two corrals at the location, but was unable to make a living there and abandoned the ranch after a few years. Since that time the location was used by cowboys whose herds were grazing in the area, until the late 1960s when the national park was established.

References

External links

National Register of Historic Places in Canyonlands National Park
Historic districts on the National Register of Historic Places in Utah
Ranches in Utah
Residential buildings on the National Register of Historic Places in Utah
National Register of Historic Places in San Juan County, Utah